The 2013 Monmouth Hawks football team represented Monmouth University in the 2013 NCAA Division I FCS football season. They were led by 21st-year head coach Kevin Callahan and played their home games at Kessler Field. After leaving in the Northeast Conference, they played 2013 as an FCS independent before joining the Big South Conference as a football only member in 2014.

Schedule

References

Monmouth
Monmouth Hawks football seasons
Monmouth Hawks football